Empathy is the debut extended play by South Korean singer D.O. It was released on July 26, 2021, by SM Entertainment. The EP features eight tracks including the lead single, "Rose". The physical album comes in three versions: one photobook version and two digipak versions (Blue and Grey).

Background
In late June 2021, SM Entertainment announced that D.O. would release his debut solo album on July 26. Pre orders became available on July 1.

Composition
Empathy features eight tracks and is based on acoustic pop and R&B. The album has two bonus tracks: an English version of the title track "Rose", and a Spanish version of "It's Love", called "Si Fueras Mía". D.O. wrote the lyrics for the title song "Rose", and "I'm Fine".

Billboard described the lead single "Rose" as "breezy folk-pop", and praised the artist's storytelling ability throughout the album.

Promotion
A highlight medley was released on July 23, which previewed the tracks on the album. The music video for the lead single "Rose" was released on July 26, the same day as the album.

Track listing

Charts

Weekly charts

Monthly charts

Year-end charts

Sales

Certifications

Accolades

Year-end lists

Music show awards

Release history

References 

2021 debut EPs
SM Entertainment EPs
Korean-language EPs